The Rabbinical Seminary International (RSI) is a rabbinical seminary located in Elmsford, New York. RSI was founded in 1955 by the Hungarian Hasidic rabbi and Kabbalist Dr. Joseph H. Gelberman, a graduate of City University of New York and Yeshiva University, who is also known as a pioneer in inter-religious dialogue. The Rabbinical Seminary International is a trans-denominational rabbinical seminary in the Neo-Hasidic tradition;
it prepares students to "serve as a teacher, counselor, worship facilitator, spiritual healer and teacher of the faith".

The course of study at RSI is self-guided with students provided reading lists and guides for studying under one or two rabbi mentors. Students can complete their training in as little as one year; the average time to receive a semikhah is two years.

References

External links 
 Official Website

1955 establishments in New York City
Jewish organizations
Educational institutions established in 1955
Jewish seminaries
Neo-Hasidism
Non-denominational Judaism